John Warner (born 1970) is an American writer, editor, and teacher of writing.  He is the author of seven books and the editor of McSweeney's Internet Tendency. He is a frequent contributor to The Morning News and has been anthologized in May Contain Nuts, Stumbling and Raging: More Politically Inspired Fiction, and The Future Dictionary of America. He frequently collaborates with writer Kevin Guilfoile. Warner's most debut novel was The Funny Man. The book has been reviewed by Publishers Weekly and Kirkus Reviews. His most recent work is the short story collection A Tough Day for the Army edited by Michael Griffith and published by the LSU Press series, Yellow Shoe Fiction.

He is the "Chief Creative Czar" of TOW Books, a publishing imprint dedicated to humorous books distributed by F+W Publications Inc.

Warner was born in Northbrook, Illinois. His great uncle is the American writer Allan Seager.

He previously taught at Clemson University in Clemson, SC. His focus was creative writing, and he was the director of a Humor Creative Inquiry. In this inquiry, he was working to teach students what humor is and how to create it. This three course series resulted in a student publication in 2008.

Currently, Warner teaches creative writing at College of Charleston in Charleston, SC.

Works 

As Author
 Sustainable. Resilient. Free.: The Future of Public Higher Education (2020)
 The Writer's Practice: Building Confidence in Your Nonfiction Writing (2019)
 Why They Can't Write: Killing the Five-Paragraph Essay and Other Necessities (2018)
 The Funny Man (2011)
 So You Want to Be President? (2008)
 Fondling Your Muse: Infallible Advice from a Published Author to the Writerly Aspirant (2005)
 My First Presidentiary (2001) (with Kevin Guilfoile)

As Editor or Co-Editor

 Mountain Man Dance Moves: The McSweeney's Book of Lists (2006)
 Created in Darkness by Troubled Americans: The Best of McSweeney's Humor Category (2005)

References

External links
 Just Visiting (Warner's blog at Inside Higher Ed)
 The Writer's Practice on Bookshop.org
 Why They Can't Write: Killing the Five Paragraph Essay and Other Necessities on Bookshop.org
 The Funny Man
 The Funny Man on Amazon
 McSweeney's Internet Tendency
 Fondling Your Muse
 Archive of online works
 TOW Books homepage

Interviews
 When Falls the Coliseum

1970 births
Living people
American online publication editors
American humorists
Writers from Chicago
Comedians from Illinois
21st-century American comedians